Rupert is the county seat and largest city of Minidoka County, Idaho,. It is part of the Burley Micropolitan Statistical Area. The population was 6,082 at the 2020 census, up from 5,554 in 2010.

Rupert, founded in 1906, sprang up after the announcement of the Minidoka Reclamation Project, which provided irrigation and electricity following the completion of the Minidoka Dam on the Snake River in 1906. After the dam was built, Rupert became one of the first cities in the world to have its streets lit by electricity.

Geography
Interstate 84 passes  to the south, and before its construction, U.S. Route 30 passed through Rupert.

Climate 
These data are from the Western Regional Climate Center, compiled over the years 1906 to 2002.

Demographics

2010 census
As of the census of 2010, there were 5,554 people, 2,026 households, and 1,397 families living in the city. The racial makeup of the city was 75.0% White, 0.3% African American, 1.6% Native American, 0.4% Asian, 20.1% from other races, and 2.6% from two or more races. Hispanic or Latino of any race were 42.9% of the population.

There were 2,026 households, of which 38.8% had children under the age of 18 living with them, 49.0% were married couples living together, 14.1% had a female householder with no husband present, 5.8% had a male householder with no wife present, and 31.0% were non-families. 26.8% of all households were made up of individuals, and 14.2% had someone living alone who was 65 years of age or older. The average household size was 2.71 and the average family size was 3.30.

The median age in the city was 33.3 years. 30.4% of residents were under the age of 18; 9.6% were between the ages of 18 and 24; 23.2% were from 25 to 44; 21.8% were from 45 to 64; and 15% were 65 years of age or older. The gender makeup of the city was 49.0% male and 51.0% female.

2000 census
As of the census of 2000, there were 5,645 people, 2,024 households, and 1,443 families living in the city. The racial makeup of the city was 72.65% White, 0.37% African American, 1.17% Native American, 0.32% Asian, 0.02% Pacific Islander, 22.69% from other races, and 2.78% from two or more races. Hispanic or Latino of any race were 35.39% of the population.

There were 2,024 households, out of which 38.3% had children under the age of 18 living with them, 54.5% were married couples living together, 12.5% had a female householder with no husband present, and 28.7% were non-families. 25.2% of all households were made up of individuals, and 12.7% had someone living alone who was 65 years of age or older. The average household size was 2.75 and the average family size was 3.31.

In the city, the population was spread out, with 31.2% under the age of 18, 10.6% from 18 to 24, 25.0% from 25 to 44, 18.8% from 45 to 64, and 14.3% who were 65 years of age or older. The median age was 32 years. For every 100 females, there were 90.8 males. For every 100 females age 18 and over, there were 86.7 males.

The median income for a household in the city was $25,105, and the median income for a family was $29,423. Males had a median income of $28,070 versus $16,779 for females. The per capita income for the city was $12,253. About 18.9% of families and 21.5% of the population were below the poverty line, including 29.2% of those under age 18 and 11.7% of those age 65 or over.

Education
Rupert is served by the Minidoka County Schools system.

Children are zoned to:
 Rupert Elementary School (Rupert - Grades K-5)
 Paul Elementary School (Paul - Grades K-5)
 Acequia Elementary School (Acequia - Grades K-5)
 Heyburn Elementary School (Heyburn - Grades K-5)
 East Minico Middle School (Rupert - grades 6-8)
 West Minico Middle School (Paul - grades 6-8)
 Minico High School (unincorporated Minidoka County, grades 9-12), midway between Paul and Rupert
 Mt. Harrison High School (Heyburn - grades 9-12, alternative high school)

Notable people
 Boyd Coddington, hot rod shop-owner and television show host
 Lou Dobbs, television anchor and pundit
 Bill Fagerbakke, actor
 Richard D. Hansen, archaeologist of Mayan ruins
 Dusty Kline, first football coach at Boise Junior College (now Boise State University)
 John Norby, former NFL running back

References

External links
  - City of Rupert
 Chamber of Commerce - Minidoka & Cassia counties

Cities in Minidoka County, Idaho
Cities in Idaho
County seats in Idaho
Burley, Idaho micropolitan area
Populated places established in 1906
1906 establishments in Idaho